This article show all participating team squads at the 2007 FIVB Women's Volleyball World Grand Prix, played by twelve countries with the final round held in Ningbo, China.

Head Coach: José Roberto Guimarães

Head Coach: Chen Zhonghe

Head Coach: Jeng Fang Fann

Head Coach: Antonio Perdomo

Head Coach: Beato Miguel Cruz

Head Coach: Massimo Barbolini

Head Coach: Shoichi Yanagimoto

Head Coach: Evgeny Sivkov

Head Coach: Avital Selinger

Head Coach: Marco Bonitta

Head Coach: Nataphon Srisamutnak

Head Coach: Lang Ping

References
FIVB

2007
2007 in volleyball